21-Deoxycortisol, also known as 11β,17α-dihydroxyprogesterone or as 11β,17α-dihydroxypregn-4-ene-3,20-dione, is a naturally occurring, endogenous steroid related to cortisol (11β,17α,21-trihydroxyprogesterone) which is formed as a metabolite from 17α-hydroxyprogesterone via 11β-hydroxylase.

Marker of 21-hydroxylase deficiency
21-deoxycortisol is a marker of congenital adrenal hyperplasia due to 21-hydroxylase deficiency, even in mild (non-classic) cases. It can be also used for newborn screening. 

The deficiency of the 21-hydroxylase enzyme leads to excess of 17α-hydroxyprogesterone, a 21-carbon (C21) steroid. This excess is accompanied by the accumulation of other C21 steroids, such as 21-deoxycortisol, which is formed by the 11β-hydroxylation of 17α-hydroxyprogesterone via 11β-hydroxylase (CYP11B1). The build-up of 21-deoxycortisol in patients with congenital adrenal hyperplasia have been described since at least 1955, this steroid was then called "21-desoxyhydrocortisone". Unlike 17α-hydroxyprogesterone, 21-deoxycortisol is not produced in the gonads and is uniquely adrenal-derived. Hence, 21-deoxycortisol is a more specific biomarker of 21-hydroxylase deficiency than is 17α-hydroxyprogesterone.

The corticosteroid activity of 21-deoxycortisol is lower than that of cortisol.

As 21-deoxycortisol can be at high levels in congenital adrenal hyperplasia, and it has structural similarity to cortisol, it can cross-react in immunoassays, resulting in a falsely normal or high cortisol result, when the true cortisol is actually low. Whereas immunoassays can suffer from cross-reactivity due to interactions with structural analogues, the selectivity offered by liquid chromatography-tandem mass spectrometry (LC-MS/MS) has largely overcome these limitations. Hence, the use of LC-MS/MS instead of immunoassays in cortisol measurement aims to provide greater specificity.

Besides 21-deoxycortisol, another C21 steroid, 21-deoxycorticosterone (11β-hydroxyprogesterone), has been proposed as a marker for 21-hydroxylase deficiency, but this marker did not gain acceptance due to the fact that testing for the levels of this steroid is not routinely offered by diagnostic laboratories.

See also
 21-Deoxycortisone
 11β-Hydroxyprogesterone
 11-Deoxycortisol
 Corticosterone
 11-Deoxycorticosterone
 Cortisone

References

External links
 Metabocard for 21-Deoxycortisol (HMDB04030) - Human Metabolome Database

Corticosteroids
Human metabolites
Pregnanes